Northwest Academy of Law is a Magnet High School in St. Louis, Missouri in the Walnut Park East neighborhood. It is a part of St. Louis Public Schools.

About
The student body is made up of 194 students with around 95% being African-American. The average ACT score is 13.4 and the graduation rate is 70%. The mission of Northwest Academy of Law is to provide rigorous and relevant educational background particularly in Law to prepare students for success in college and in the workplace. Northwest holds mock court sessions where students defend themselves when they are accused of breaking rules. In 2017, Northwest won its first state championship in basketball

References

High schools in St. Louis
Magnet schools in St. Louis
Public high schools in Missouri
Buildings and structures in St. Louis